The 2023 AFC U-20 Asian Cup will be an international football tournament that wil be held in Uzbekistan from 1 to 18 March 2023. The sixteen participating national teams were required to register a squad of a minimum of 18 and a maximum of 23 players, including at least three goalkeepers (Regulations Article 26.3). Only players in these squads are eligible to take part in the tournament. The tournament exclusively requires players to be born between 1 January 2003 and 31 December 2007 to be eligible (Regulations Article 22.1), that is, they must be a maximun of 20 years old and at least 16 years old by the end of the calendar year in which the competition is played.

Each participating national team had to submit a provisional list of a minimum of 18 and a maximum of 50 players (including at least four goalkeepers) to the Asian Football Confederation (AFC), via the AFC Administration System (AFCAS), no later than thirty days prior to its first match of the competition. Up to 5 players could be replaced or added to the provisional list, for any reason, provided that the maximum number of registered players (50) is not exceeded no later than seven days prior to its first match of the competition (Regulations Article 25). The final list of up to 23 players per national team had to be submitted to AFC, via AFCAS, by latest ten days prior to the first match of the tournament. All players in the final list had to be chosen from the respective provisional list. Teams are permitted to replace any player up to 6 hours prior to their first match of the competition. In addition, any player with positive PCR tests for SARS-CoV-2 may be replaced before and during the tournament up to six hours before the next match of the interested national team. The replacement player must come from the provisional list and will be assigned the shirt number of the replaced player (Regulations Article 26.2).

The age listed for each player is on 1 March 2023, the first day of the tournament. A flag is included for coaches who are of a different nationality than their own national team. Players name marked in bold have been capped at full international level.

Group A

Uzbekistan
Uzbekistan announced a provisional squad of 25 players on 3 February 2023. The final squad of 23 players was announced on 25 February 2023.

Head coach: Ravshan Khaydarov

Indonesia
Indonesia announced a provisional squad of 30 players on 27 January 2023. The final squad of 23 players was announced on 23 February 2023. Zanadin Fariz withdrew injured on 1 March 2023, and was replaced by Brandon Scheunemann.

Head coach:  Shin Tae-yong

Iraq
Iraq announced their final squad of 23 players on 7 February 2023. Goalkeeper Ridha Abdulaziz was replaced by Omran Zaky.

Head coach: Emad Mohammed

Syria
Syria announced their final squad of 23 players on 25 February 2023.

Head coach:  Mark Wotte

Group B

Qatar
Qatar announced their final squad of 23 players on 27 February 2023.

Head coach:  Iñaki González

Australia
Australia announced their squad of 23 players on 7 February 2023.

Head coach:  Trevor Morgan

Vietnam
Vietnam announced a provisional squad of 30 players on 14 February 2023. The final squad of 23 players was announced on 25 February 2023.

Head coach: Hoàng Anh Tuấn

Iran
Iran announced their provisional squad of 50 players on 8 February 2023.

Head coach: Samad Marfavi

Group C

South Korea
South Korea announced a provisional squad of 26 players on 11 February 2023. The final squad of 23 players was announced on 21 February 2023.

Head coach: Kim Eun-jung

Tajikistan
Tajikistan announced a provisional squad of 26 players on 11 February 2023. The final squad of 23 players was announced on 21 February 2023.

Head coach:  Oleg Kubarev

Jordan
Jordan announced their final squad of 23 players on 22 February 2023.

Head coach: Islam Al-Diabat

Oman
Oman announced their final squad of 23 players on 22 February 2023.

Head coach:  David Gordo

Group D

Saudi Arabia
Saudi Arabia announced a provisional squad of 26 players on 13 February 2023. The final squad of 23 players was announced on 27 February 2023.

Head coach: Saleh Al-Mohammadi

Japan
Japan announced their squad of 23 players on 7 February 2023. Shinya Nakano was replaced by Kosuke Matsumura after picking up an injury.

Head coach: Koichi Togashi

China
China announced a provisional squad of 31 players on 10 January 2023, which was later reduced to 28 players. The final squad of 23 players was announced on 23 February 2023.

Head coach:  Antonio Puche

Kyrgyzstan
Kyrgyzstan announced a provisional squad of 28 players on 13 January 2023. The final squad of 23 players was announced on 25 February 2023.

Head coach:  Maksim Lisitsyn

References

External links

AFC U-19 Championship squads